Lauren Marcus (born November 27, 1985) is an American actress, singer and songwriter.

Early life and education 
Marcus was raised in the suburbs of Chicago, and attended New Trier High School for three years before relocating to Garrison, NY, where she attended James I. O'Neill High School. She attended New York University's Vocal Performance program at the Steinhardt School of Education, and received a Bachelor of Music. Marcus received her Master of Arts at The Royal Conservatoire of Scotland, where she studied acting.

Career
Marcus made her Broadway debut as Brooke Lohst in Be More Chill at the Lyceum Theatre in February 2019, after originating the role first at Two River Theatre in 2015, and then again off-Broadway at the Signature Theatre in the summer of 2018.

She appeared as Amy in Company at Barrington Stage Company alongside Aaron Tveit. She received praise for her performance. 

In winter 2018, she played Brigid in The Humans at the St. Louis Repertory Theatre, and was subsequently nominated for a BroadwayWorld Regional Theatre Award as Best Supporting Actress in a Drama. She also received a JJ Award from the St. Louis Post Dispatch for her performance alongside Kathleen Wise.

Marcus is also a singer and songwriter, and performs regularly with her band around New York City. She released her debut EP, Never Really Done with You, in July 2016 at Joe's Pub.

Marcus appears in the 2021 American biographical musical drama film Tick, Tick... Boom!. 

In January of 2022, Marcus co-starred in Punk Rock Girl, a new musical that premiered at The Argyle Theatre in Babylon Village, NY. Later in 2022, she signed on as understudy for Beth Ann, played by Caissie Levy, in Sarah Silverman's play The Bedwetter at Atlantic Theatre Company, and performed on several dates while Levy was out sick. In September and October of 2022, Marcus played Tzeitzel in the Lyric Opera's production of Fiddler on the Roof.

Personal life 

Marcus has been married to musical theatre writer Joe Iconis since 2015. They reside in New York City and frequently work together.

Theater credits

References 

Living people
American musical theatre actresses
American stage actresses
New York University alumni
1985 births
21st-century American actresses
Alumni of the Royal Conservatoire of Scotland